Thanatus vulgaris is a species of running crab spider in the family Philodromidae. It is found in North America, Europe, North Africa, Turkey, Israel, Caucasus, a range from Russia (European to Far East), Central Asia, China, and Korea.

Subspecies
These two subspecies belong to the species Thanatus vulgaris:
 (Thanatus vulgaris vulgaris) Simon, 1870
 Thanatus vulgaris creticus Kulczynski, 1903

References

External links

 

Philodromidae
Articles created by Qbugbot
Spiders described in 1870